Rachamim Talbi (born Rahamim Talbiev (born 17 May 1943 in Vidin, Bulgaria) is a former Israeli football forward, who played for the Israel national team between 1965 and 1973. He was part of the Israel squad for the 1970 World Cup.

At club level, Talbi played for Maccabi Tel Aviv and Hapoel Marmorek.

External links
 
 
 

1943 births
Israeli footballers
People from Vidin
Living people
Israeli Jews
Bulgarian Jews
Footballers from Jaffa
Maccabi Tel Aviv F.C. players
Association football forwards
Israel international footballers
1964 AFC Asian Cup players
1968 AFC Asian Cup players
Olympic footballers of Israel
Footballers at the 1968 Summer Olympics
1970 FIFA World Cup players
Bulgarian Jews in Israel
Israeli people of Bulgarian-Jewish descent
Bulgarian emigrants to Israel
Israeli football managers
Maccabi Yavne F.C. managers